Sillhövda AIK is a Swedish football club located in Holmsjö in Karlskrona Municipality, Blekinge County.

Background
Sillhövda Allmänna Idrottsklubb (abbreviated SAIK) was founded on 28 December 1967 following the merger of the Saleboda IF and Holmsjö IF clubs. Activities other than football were table tennis and winter sports.  Over the years the club has progressed both on and off the field. A long cherished dream came true in 1990 with the provision of a clubhouse.

Since their foundation Sillhövda AIK has participated mainly in the middle and lower divisions of the Swedish football league system.  The club currently plays in Division 3 Sydöstra Götaland which is the fifth tier of Swedish football. They play their home matches at the Bredasjön in Holmsjö. 2016 Sillhövda AIK decided to pay the pay out clause on Anton Alexandersson to get him back from Karlskrona UF. Later that year he got the club promoted and got a huge bonus from one of their sponsors Alexanderssons Maskinsnickeri AB around £10.

Sillhövda AIK are affiliated to Blekinge Fotbollförbund.

Recent history
In recent seasons Sillhövda AIK have competed in the following divisions:

2011 – Division III, Sydöstra Götaland
2010 – Division IV, Blekinge
2009 – Division IV, Blekinge
2008 – Division IV, Blekinge
2007 – Division IV, Blekinge
2006 – Division IV, Blekinge
2005 – Division IV, Blekinge
2004 – Division IV, Blekinge
2003 – Division IV, Blekinge
2002 – Division IV, Blekinge
2001 – Division V, Blekinge Östra
2000 – Division V, Blekinge Östra
1999 – Division V, Blekinge

Attendances

In recent seasons Sillhövda AIK have had the following average attendances:

Footnotes

External links
 Sillhövda AIK – Official website
 Sillhövda AIK on Facebook

Football clubs in Blekinge County
Association football clubs established in 1967
1967 establishments in Sweden